"7+3" in the context of chemotherapy is an acronym for a chemotherapy regimen that is most often used today (as of 2014) as first-line induction therapy (to induce remission) in acute myelogenous leukemia, excluding the acute promyelocytic leukemia form, which is better treated with ATRA and/or arsenic trioxide and requires less chemotherapy (if requires it at all, which is not always the case).

The name "7+3" comes from the duration of chemotherapy course, which consists of 7 days of standard-dose cytarabine, and 3 days of an anthracycline antibiotic or an anthracenedione, most often daunorubicin (can be substituted for doxorubicin or idarubicin or mitoxantrone).

Dosing regimen

Standard-dose cytarabine plus daunorubicin (DA or DAC chemotherapy)

Standard-dose cytarabine plus idarubicin (IA or IAC chemotherapy)

Standard-dose cytarabine plus mitoxantrone (MA or MAC chemotherapy)

Intensified versions 

There were attempts to intensify the "7+3" regimen in order to try to improve its efficacy. Attempts were made to prolong the course (cytarabine for 10 days instead of 7, or daunorubicin/idarubicin for 4–5 days instead of 3). 

On the other hand, there were attempts to minimize the toxicity of the regimen by reducing the dose or the duration of the course. But this proved to compromise the efficacy of the regimen.

The addition of vinca alkaloids (vincristine or vinblastine) to the "7+3" regimen, which addition was quite popular in AML(ALL?) in old times (when the biology of AML and the differences between AML and ALL was poorly understood) proved to be harmful in AML, lowering the chance of the patient to get remission. This is because vinca alkaloids are rapidly deactivated in myeloid cells by their enzyme myeloperoxidase. So the vinca alkaloids do much more damage to the lymphoid cell lines (including the T-cell lines responsible for antileukemic immunity) than to the myeloid cell lines. Moreover, vinca alkaloids in the context of AML cause AML cells to undergo a cell cycle arrest in the phase that renders those cells less sensitive to cytarabine and anthracyclines.

Addition of glucocorticoids (like prednisolone) or methotrexate or alkylating drugs (like cyclophosphamide or melphalan) to the "7+3" regimen is also of no benefit in AML.

The addition of etoposide to the standard "7+3" regimen is sometimes of benefit in poor-risk patients (many of which are primary refractory to standard "7+3" induction regimens). It gave rise to the so-called ADE (or DAE = DA + etoposide) induction regimen in AML. The ADE induction (unlike, say, combinations of 7+3 with vinca alkaloids or prednisolone) is still sometimes used, especially in poor-risk AML patients.

The addition of 6-thioguanine gave rise to the DAT regimen, and the addition of 6-mercaptopurine gave rise to the DAM regimen.

References 

Chemotherapy regimens used in acute myeloid leukemia